Malu Town is an urban town in Anhua County, Hunan Province, People's Republic of China.

Administrative division
The town is divided into 35 villages and one community:

References

External links

Divisions of Anhua County